Chiarenza may refer to:

 Chiarenza, a former name of Glarentza, Greece
 Chiarenza, an Italian surname:
 Carl Chiarenza (b. 1935), an American photographer
 Vincenzo Chiarenza (b. 1954), an Italian soccer player and coach
 A magical sword of Italian legend, preserved in the Russian tales of the Sword Kladenets